Leonovo is a rural locality (a village) in Petushinskoye Rural Settlement, Petushinsky District, Vladimir Oblast, Russia. The population was 453 as of 2010. There are 13 streets.

Geography 
Leonovo is located 6 km west of Petushki (the district's administrative centre) by road. Novoye Annino is the nearest rural locality.

References 

Rural localities in Petushinsky District